The University of Bourges was a university located in Bourges, France. It was founded by Louis XI in 1463 and closed during the French Revolution.

Until the mid-17th century, lack of suitable legal training at home meant many Scots seeking to practice law studied at Bourges, Paris or Orléans; thereafter, most did so at Leyden University in the Dutch Republic.

Notable alumni
 Patrick Adamson (1543–1591)
 John Calvin (1509–1564)
 Hugues Doneau (1527–1591)
 Francois Douaren (1509–1559) 
 Conrad Gessner (1516–1565)
 Franciscus Junius (the elder) (1545–1602)
 Esmé Stewart, 3rd Duke of Lennox (1579–1624)

See also 
 List of medieval universities

References

Sources
 
 J.-Y. Ribault, "L'Ancienne université de Bourges", in: Académie d'Orléans, Guide de l'étudiant, année 1964-1965, pp. 23–25.

 
1463 establishments in Europe
1460s establishments in France
Bourges, University of
Bourges, University of